or  (literally "cheese curd") is a firm but very lightweight cheese produced in Northeastern Brazil, with an almost "squeaky" texture when bitten into (similar to cheese curds). 

It is a popular and cheap snack for beach-goers in Brazil or in homemade churrasco, where the cheese is cooked over a charcoal grill, often with a sprinkling of oregano or garlic-flavored sauce. It is eaten off a stick, much like a kebab. It gets a golden surface when grilled, and does not melt much.

See also 
List of Brazilian dishes
Brazilian cuisine
Halloumi
 List of cheeses

External links
FAO document describing various cheeses

Brazilian cheeses
Cow's-milk cheeses